Professor Shazia Sadiq  is a computer scientist based in Queensland, Australia.

Background 
Originally from Pakistan, Sadiq was one of a handful of women to undertake studies in a computer science program within Pakistan at Quaid-i-Azam University, Islamabad, Pakistan in 1980s, and wrote her first computer program in Fortran using punched cards.

She later received a NORAD scholarship to undertake a masters in computer science from the Asian Institute of Technology, Bangkok, Thailand. She then went on to do a PhD in Information Systems at the University of Queensland, Brisbane Australia, with Professor Maria Orlowska.

Since 2001 Sadiq has been based in the School of Information Technology and Electrical Engineering, at the University of Queensland. She conducts research and teaching in databases and information systems.

She serves as deputy chair on the Australian Academy of Science’s National Committee on Information and Communication Sciences and formerly as vice president of the Asia Pacific Chapter of IQ International – the International Association of Information and Data Quality.

Education 
 Doctor of Philosophy (The University of Queensland, Brisbane, Australia, 2002)
 Masters in Computer Science (Asian Institute of Technology, Bangkok, Thailand, 1993)
 Masters in Computer Science (Quaid-i-Azam University, Islamabad, Pakistan, 1989)

Research and advocacy
Sadiq’s research is focused on developing innovative solutions for Business Information Systems. She has published over 100 publications in prestigious journals and conferences such as SIGMOD, VLDBJ, TKDE, WWWJ, ISJ, CAiSE, ER, and BPM. She has also received several received grants. Her work on declarative modeling of complex and dynamic business requirements has been applied in the areas of business process management, and GRC (governance, risk and compliance) with approximately 1000 citations on the collective works. Sadiq is leading a group of researchers and students in the area of big data quality and integration with novel applications in transportation, social media and learning analytics. In addition to her work in research, Sadiq contributes to the professional community of data and information quality professionals as a board member of the Asia-Pacific Chapter of the International Association of Information and Data Quality and as convener of the Queensland Data Quality Roundtable.

Sadiq has also contributed to the enhancement of Information and Communications Technology (ICT) education for the last fifteen years. She has devoted considerable energy towards raising awareness of the importance of ICT skills for a number of disciplines, while ensuring that ICT students are equipped with the knowledge and confidence to tackle the rising challenges of a constantly evolving ICT landscape and a data driven society. Her teaching methods have been recognized through publications in leading conferences and journals, leadership roles at national and international ICT educational forums, and through University awards for teaching excellence.

Sadiq is an active supporter of initiatives toward improving female participation in ICT. She developed an interactive workshop series, which has been delivered to over a thousand high school students since 2006. The initiative aims to promote interest in ICT-related study and professional pursuits, especially for female students. The primary reason behind the design of the workshops is to demonstrate computing principles and techniques by masking them in various socially relevant applications such as health, forensics, genetics, fashion, movie making, game design, environment modeling, etc. Sadiq also gives role model talks; and participates in various girls in ICT events, such as Girls Into Doing Great Information Technology Society (GIDGITS) and “Technology Takes You Anywhere”.

Awards
 Women in Technology Award for InfoTech Research 2012
 The University of Queensland Award for Teaching Excellence 2012
Fellow of the Australian Academy of Technology and Engineering 2020

External links
 Professor Shazia Sadiq, Australian Academy of Science

References

Australian women scientists
Living people
Year of birth missing (living people)
Computer scientists
Information systems